Mario Delaš (born January 16, 1990) is a Croatian professional basketball player for Gipuzkoa in the Spanish second-tier LEB Oro. He is a 2.07 m (6'9 ") tall power forward / center.

Professional career
Mario Delaš made his professional debut in KK Split, during the 2006–07 season. In January 2010, he signed a contract with BC Žalgiris for the next three-and-half seasons. During the 2010–11 season, he was loaned to KK Cibona and BC Šiauliai. He spent most of the 2011–12 season on loan in the Žalgiris subsidiary BC Baltai, returning to the Žalgiris team in March 2013. He signed with Obradoiro CAB in the summer of 2013. On June 30, 2014, he signed a multi-year deal with Cedevita Zagreb. In the first days of 2016, after spending the first half of the 2015–16 season in Cedevita, without playing a single minute, he moved to the Estonian side Kalev/Cramo for the rest of the season. On September 19, 2016, he signed with the Italian Serie A club Orlandina Basket. On February 14, 2018, he parted ways with Orlandina. Two days later, he signed with Pallacanestro Varese for the remainder of the season.

In December, 2019 Delaš returned to Split of the Croatian League. After spending a month and playing only four games for Split, in January 2020, Delaš moved to XL Extralight Montegranaro of the Italian second-tier Serie A2.

On January 11, 2021, Delaš signed with GTK Gliwice of the PLK.

In August, 2021, Delaš signed with Gipuzkoa of the Spanish second-tier LEB Oro.

National team career
Delaš represented his country's junior national teams in Under-16, Under-18, Under-19 and Under-20 competitions, winning bronze medals at the 2008 FIBA Europe Under-18 Championship, and at the 2009 FIBA Under-19 World Cup. He was selected to the All-Tournament Teams of both championships, and also won the MVP award in the latter tournament, averaging 20 points per game. His first call-up to the senior men's Croatian national basketball team came in 2013. He was a part of the Croatian team that took 4th place at the 2013 EuroBasket, where he played only a minor role in his team's success.

Personal life
He is the younger brother of Ante Delaš, who is also a professional basketball player, and with whom he played with in Split, Cedevita and the Croatian national basketball team.

References

External links
 Mario Delaš at aba-liga.com
 Mario Delaš at acb.com 
 Mario Delaš at euroleague.net
 Mario Delaš at fibaeurope.com
 Mario Delaš at hks-cbf.hr
 Mario Delaš at realGM

1990 births
Living people
ABA League players
BC Kalev/Cramo players
BC Körmend players
BC Šiauliai players
BC Žalgiris players
Centers (basketball)
Croatian expatriate basketball people in Spain
Croatian expatriate sportspeople in Lithuania
Croatian men's basketball players
Expatriate basketball people in Estonia
KK Cedevita players
KK Cibona players
KK Split players
Lega Basket Serie A players
Liga ACB players
LSU-Atletas basketball players
Obradoiro CAB players
Orlandina Basket players
Pallacanestro Varese players
Power forwards (basketball)
GTK Gliwice players